The Santiago Bernabéu Stadium is a football stadium in Madrid, Spain. With a current seating capacity of 81,044, it has been the home stadium of Real Madrid since its completion in 1947. It is the second-largest stadium in Spain and third-largest home to a top-flight European club after Camp Nou and Westfalenstadion.

Named after footballer and legendary Real Madrid president Santiago Bernabéu (1895–1978), the stadium is one of the world's most famous football venues. It has hosted the final of the European Cup/UEFA Champions League on four occasions: in 1957, 1969, 1980, 2010. The stadium also hosted the second leg of the 2018 Copa Libertadores Finals, making Santiago Bernabéu the first (and only) stadium to host the two most important premier continental cup finals (UEFA Champions League and Copa Libertadores).

The final matches for the 1964 European Nations' Cup and the 1982 FIFA World Cup were also held at the Bernabéu, making it the first stadium in Europe to host both a UEFA Euro final and a FIFA World Cup final.

History

On 22 June 1944, the Banco Mercantil e Industrial bank granted credit to Santiago Bernabéu and Rafael Salgado for the purchase of the land adjacent to the old Chamartín Stadium. On 5 September 1944, architects Manuel Muñoz Monasterio and Luis Alemany Soler were hired and the structure on the site began to give way to the new stadium. On 27 October 1944, construction work on the stadium began, which was being built partly on the old site and on the grounds of Villa Ulpiana. In the meantime, Real Madrid played its home games at the Estadio Metropolitano in the 1946–47 season and at the start of the 1947–48 season.

The stadium was inaugurated on 14 December 1947 with a match between Real Madrid and the Portuguese side Os Belenenses. After the preliminaries, at 15:30 referee Pedro Escartín from the Madrid school started the match. Real Madrid striker Sabino Barinaga scored the first goal in the 15th minute with a header. At the end of the match, Barinaga received a recognition pennant. Afterwards, players and managers of both teams celebrated with a dinner. The first official match took place on 28 December 1947 on matchday 12 of La Liga against Atlético de Bilbao, which had been postponed due to the inauguration of the stadium. The match was refereed by José Fombona Fernández from the Asturian school and ended with a 5–1 victory for Los Blancos. The first goal was scored in the 4th minute by Madrid midfielder Chus Alonso after receiving a pass from Barinaga.

The stadium had an initial capacity of 75,145 spectators, 27,645 of which had seats (7,125 covered) and 47,500 for standing fans.

1950s
The first major renovation occurred in 1955. On 19 June of that year, the stadium expanded to accommodate 125,000 spectators. Thus, the Madrid coliseum became the biggest stadium of all the participants of the newly established European Cup.

On 4 January 1955, after the General Assembly of Members Compromisaros, it was decided that the stadium adopt its present name in honour of club President Santiago Bernabéu.

In March 1957, floodlights were installed to allow nighttime games. On 18 May of the same year, the new floodlights were officially inaugurated in a game against Brazilian club Sport Recife, which Real Madrid won 5–3.

1960s & 1970s
In 1965, the transfer of all the club's offices to the stadium was completed, which previously had been moved between multiple venues in the capital.

On 14 December 1972, coinciding with the 25th anniversary of the Santiago Bernabéu's inauguration, the first electronic scoreboard was installed inside the stadium and later utilized for the first time in a friendly match against the same rival that Madrid faced in 1947, the Portuguese Belenenses. The match ended with a 2–1 Real victory. Days before the scoreboard had already been used for the farewell ceremony of the Madrid legend Paco Gento.

1980s
The next big changes did not occur until the early 1980s with the hosting of the 1982 FIFA World Cup in Spain. The stadium had to adapt to the changing times and with this, architects Rafael Luis Alemany and Manuel Salinas were hired for the stadium's renovation project. The brothers were sons of Luis Alemany Soler, who carried out the original construction project next to Muñoz Monasterio. The work lasted 16 months and had a cost of 704 million pesetas (US $4.7 million), of which 530 million was paid by the City of Madrid.

The improvements included a number of points. First, FIFA forced two-thirds of the seating area to be covered. For this reason, Real Madrid installed a roof covering the perimeter of the first and second tiers of seating, except the east side. The stadium's capacity was reduced from 120,000 to 98,000 spectators, 24,550 of which were covered by the new roof. The project also involved remodeling the façade, the installation of new electronic signs in the north and south ends, as well as the renovation of the press areas, lockers rooms, access, and ancillary areas.

The stadium hosted four matches in the World Cup: three second-round Group Two matches (West Germany vs. England, West Germany vs. Spain, and Spain vs. England) and the prestigious final match (Italy vs. West Germany).

1990s
Following a series of spectator fatalities in the 1980s (most notably the Heysel Stadium in Belgium and the Hillsborough Stadium in England), English authorities released the Taylor Report on how to improve football spectator safety in English venues. UEFA followed suit across Europe. The stadium was forced to create separate shortcuts to different stadium sections and seats for all spectators. 

In 1992, the board of Ramón Mendoza awarded an expansion and renovation project to Gines Navarro Construcciones, S.A. The work started on 7 February 1992 and concluded on 7 May 1994 with a final cost of more than 5 billion pesetas, substantially raising the debt of the club, which no longer had any institutional support. The work concluded with the creation of an amphitheater on the west side and in the foundations, as well as the opening of the new commercial center, "La esquina del Bernabéu." In total, 20,200 upgraded seats were installed, with each seat having a tilt of 87 degrees, ensuring a perfect view and proximity to the pitch. In addition, four entrance towers were erected on the outside, each with two staircases and a central spiral ramp, so the spectators could access the new tier and exit more quickly.

With the new structure, the height of the stadium was increased from 22 m to 45 m. This caused problems during the winter, leaving two-thirds of the field of play in the shade. This lack of sunlight led to grass deterioration on the pitch. For this reason, a polypropylene pipe network was installed at a 20 cm depth under the pitch. At over 30 km long the pipe system circulates hot water, keeping the turf from freezing in cold temperatures.

Also, due to the height of the stand, it was necessary to improve and increase the lighting capability. A retractable protective roof was also installed to protect the fans from the elements. After the renovation, the stadium's capacity was 106,000 spectators.

In 1997, with Lorenzo Sanz as president, UEFA required the Santiago Bernabéu to adopt an all-seating arrangement, bringing its capacity down from 106,000 to 74,328 spectators.

On 20 May 1999, the Tour Bernabéu opened, along with the club museum.

2000s

As the club kept growing in all regards, thoughts for further changes to the stadium appeared. When Florentino Pérez became the president of the club, he launched a "master plan" with one goal: to improve the comfort of the Santiago Bernabéu and the quality of its facilities, and maximise revenue for the stadium.

Pérez invested €127 million in five years (2001–2006) by adding an expansion to the east side of the stadium, as well as adding a new façade on Father Damien street, new boxes and VIP areas, new dressing rooms, a new stage in honour of the east side, a new press area (also located on the east side), a new audio system, new bars, integration of heating in the stands, panoramic lifts, new restaurants, escalators in the tower access, and implementation of the multipurpose building in Father Damien street. Following the enlargement of the lateral east side and the creation of new galleries, the capacity of the Santiago Bernabéu was expanded to 80,354, all seated.

 In addition, UEFA decided to give the Santiago Bernabéu elite stadium status on 14 November 2007, a month before the celebration of the 60th anniversary of the inauguration of the stadium. In the latest UEFA revision on 24 October, the day a Champions League group stage match against Olympiacos was played, they decided the stadium met the expectations of an elite stadium, and upgraded its category accordingly. 

Pérez proposed construction of a retractable roof before he resigned in 2005. In 2009, following the re-election of Pérez as the club president, it was announced that the roof construction was looking unlikely due to the financial situation of the club. According to Spanish sports newspaper Marca, however, Pérez wants to restructure Santiago Bernabéu. According to the newspaper, the architect in charge will be chosen from among a shortlist of Spanish architects Santiago Calatrava and Pritzker Prize-winner Rafael Moneo, and Chinese-American Ieoh Ming Pei, also a Pritzker winner.

2010s
In 2011, around 1,000 seats were added, bringing the stadium to its current capacity, 81,044.

On 16 October 2013, Pérez announced that Real Madrid was seeking to sell the naming rights for its stadium and looking for a sponsor for the €400 million renovation project. The proposed design of the stadium renovation, produced by German architects GMP, was unveiled on 31 January 2014. The bold design includes a retractable roof, with the overall cost of around €400 million likely to be met half via the sale of naming rights and half via a bond issue to Real members according to Spanish media reports. Pérez said, "We want to make the Santiago Bernabéu the best stadium in the world." Real Madrid then announced a sponsorship agreement with IPIC to assist the club in the redevelopment of the stadium. Pérez then said that in compliance to the agreement the name of the stadium would be renamed "IPIC Bernabeu" or "CEPSA Bernabeu". The surface has been replaced with Mixto hybrid grass manufactured in Italy.

Real Madrid and Microsoft launched the first interactive audioguide for the Bernabéu Tour on 3 April 2017. Over 200,000 people toured the stadium in 2016, of whom over 60% were foreigners.

Renovation plans
A €525-million renovation project was initially set to begin in summer 2017, but began in 2019. The capacity will be increased by approximately 4000 with the addition of an extra tier, bringing it to just over the 85,000 mark. Furthermore, the height will also be increased by ten metres and a retractable roof as well as a retractable pitch will be added. The club is expected to sell the naming rights to the renovated stadium.

The work was initially expected to last three and a half years (2019–2022). However, the COVID-19 pandemic and Russian invasion of Ukraine caused significant disruption to supply chains, prompting the club to postpone the stadium's inauguration to 2023.

The renovation team utilises Roman techniques with raising the top, so as not to affect the operation of the stadium during the football season. "The project is complex because it will not stop the football and therefore complicates the works and design, which has a roof that encloses the whole stadium. They are going to lift the roof like the Romans did, but with modern technology. They will raise the inner ring by string-pulling with hydraulic jacks, bridge technology and ski lifts in a short period of time in the summer to respect the sporting calendar," said Tristán López Chicheri, the individual in charge of the renovation. In March 2020, Real Madrid decided to expedite the renovations after the Royal Spanish Football Federation suspended La Liga due to the COVID-19 pandemic. The expedition included interior work, which made the pitch unplayable and prompted Real Madrid to play their matches at the Alfredo Di Stéfano Stadium instead until the end of the 2020–21 season.

Chicheri believes the renovation will bring tourists to the stadium all year round, with many attractions planned. The stadium is supposed to have more restaurants, a shopping centre and a hotel, with some rooms having a view of the pitch. The "digital stadium of the future" will be equipped with a 360-degree screen and retractable roof. "It is not only on matchdays that it will be used – there are venues like the Bernabéu that are in the middle of the city and it is a shame that they have no life beyond 35–40 matches a year," said Chicheri.

Location
The stadium is located in the Chamartín district of Madrid. It occupies the block bounded by the Paseo de la Castellana and the streets of Concha Espina, Padre Damián, and Rafael Salgado.

Transportation
The stadium is served by its own metro station along the Line 10 called Santiago Bernabéu. It is also served by bus routes 14, 27, 40, 43, 120, 147 and 150.

Major international tournaments

Euro 1964

Santiago Bernabéu hosted three matches of the 1964 European Nations' Cup, a tournament which Spain hosted: one qualifying match and two in the main tournament, including the final. All three matches involved Spain.

Qualifying rounds
The stadium hosted one qualifying round match against Romania, which resulted in a 6–0 win.

Main tournament
The stadium hosted two matches of the tournament, including the final.

Final

The match was contested by the 1960 winners, the Soviet Union, and the hosts, Spain, at the Santiago Bernabéu Stadium in Madrid. Spain won the match 2–1, with goals coming from Chus Pereda and Marcelino. Galimzyan Khusainov scored for the Soviet Union.

1982 FIFA World Cup

In the 1982 World Cup held in Spain, the Santiago Bernabéu Stadium hosted four matches: three in the second round (West Germany–England, West Germany–Spain and Spain–England) as well as the final between West Germany and Italy.

Main tournament

Second round
The stadium hosted three second round matches.

Final

The 1982 FIFA World Cup Final was a football match contested between Italy and West Germany. It was played on 11 July 1982.
After a scoreless first half during which Antonio Cabrini fired a penalty low and wide to the right of goal, Paolo Rossi scored first, heading home a bouncing Claudio Gentile cross from the right from close range. Marco Tardelli then scored from the edge of the area with a low left footed shot before Alessandro Altobelli, at the end of a counterattack by winger Bruno Conti, made it 3–0 with another low left footed shot.
Italy's lead appeared secure, encouraging Italian president Sandro Pertini to wag his finger at the cameras in a playful 'not going to catch us now' gesture from the stands. Paul Breitner scored for Germany in the 83rd minute, firing low past the goalkeeper from the right, but Italy held on to claim their first World Cup title in 44 years, and their third in total with a 3–1 victory.

Major games

1957 European Cup Final

This match was contested between Real Madrid, champions of Spain, and Fiorentina, champions of Italy. In this season, 16 teams played for the trophy. Real Madrid won 2–0 in the final after goals from Alfredo Di Stéfano and Francisco Gento in the second half. This was the second consecutive European Cup for Real Madrid after having won his first trophy one year before, at the Parc des Princes against Stade de Reims.

1969 European Cup Final

This year Milan, champions of Italy, played Ajax, champions of the Netherlands, to determine who would be the champions of Europe. Milan defeated Ajax 4–1 to win their second European championship. Ajax made history by being the first Dutch team to reach a final.

1980 European Cup Final

In this final, defending champions Nottingham Forest of England faced Hamburger SV, champions of Germany. The match ended with a victory for the English team with a 1–0 result. The new champions of Europe retained the trophy and achieved a historic second consecutive European Cup.

2010 UEFA Champions League Final

A game played between two best teams in the Champions League which consists of group stage and knock-out stage. The final is played at a different stadium each year. In 2010, Bayern Munich, who eliminated Lyon in the semi-finals, faced Internazionale, who defeated Barcelona in the semi-finals. Inter won 2–0 after two goals from Diego Milito.

2018 Copa Libertadores Final

The two-legged 2018 CONMEBOL Libertadores final pitted Argentine archrivals of Buenos Aires in Boca Juniors and River Plate against each other in the final for the first time. The first leg was held at Boca Juniors' home pitch, La Bombonera, on 11 November 2018, ending in a 2–2 draw with no away goal rule applied.

During the planned second leg on 24 November 2018, scheduled for El Monumental, the home stadium of River Plate, numerous River Plate fans threw glass bottles and stones at the Boca Juniors team bus headed to the stadium, injuring numerous players as a result. CONMEBOL postponed the match and moved the second leg to Europe for 9 December 2018 in Madrid, a neutral site, for security and travel reasons. Both sets of fans attended the match as River Plate won 3–1 after extra time (5–3 on aggregate) to lift the trophy outside of South America for the first time.

References

External links

Official Website
Bernabéu Tour
Santiago Bernabéu Stadium on Facebook
Santiago Bernabéu Stadium at Google Maps
Profile at Estadios de España 

Real Madrid CF
Football venues in Madrid
1982 FIFA World Cup stadiums
1964 European Nations' Cup stadiums
Sports venues completed in 1947
Spain
1947 establishments in Spain
UEFA European Championship final stadiums
Buildings and structures in Chamartín District, Madrid